Óscar Valentín Martín Luengo (born 20 August 1994) is a Spanish professional footballer who plays as a central midfielder for Rayo Vallecano.

Career
Born in Ajofrín, Toledo, Castile-La Mancha, Valentín finished his formation with CF Rayo Majadahonda, and made his senior debut during the 2012–13 campaign, in Tercera División. In 2013, he moved to fellow fourth division side Fútbol Alcobendas Sport.

In July 2014, Valentín joined Rayo Vallecano and was immediately loaned back to Alcobendas. Upon returning, he was assigned to the reserves also in the fourth division.

On 23 July 2016, Valentín joined Alcobendas on a permanent basis. The following 1 July, he returned to his former club Rayo Majadahonda, now assigned to the first team in Segunda División B.

Valentín was a regular starter during the 2017–18 campaign, contributing with 33 league appearances as his side achieved promotion to Segunda División for the first time ever. He made his professional debut on 19 August 2018, starting in a 2–1 away loss against Real Zaragoza.

Valentín scored his first professional goal on 12 May 2019, but in a 3–2 home loss against Albacete Balompié. He finished the campaign as an undisputed starter, as his team was immediately relegated back.

On 25 June 2019, Valentín signed a four-year contract with Rayo Vallecano.

Career statistics

Club

References

External links

1994 births
Living people
Sportspeople from the Province of Toledo
Spanish footballers
Footballers from Castilla–La Mancha
Association football midfielders
La Liga players
Segunda División players
Segunda División B players
Tercera División players
CD Paracuellos Antamira players
Rayo Vallecano B players
CF Rayo Majadahonda players
Rayo Vallecano players